"Run Woman Run" is a song written by Ann Booth, Duke Goff and Dan Hoffman, and recorded by American country music artist Tammy Wynette.  It was released in August 1970 as a single from the album The First Lady.  The song went to number one on the country charts, where it spent two weeks at the top and a total of thirteen weeks on the country charts.

Chart performance

References

1970 singles
Tammy Wynette songs
Song recordings produced by Billy Sherrill
Epic Records singles
1970 songs